Pinnacle State Park and Golf Course is a  state park located in Steuben County, New York. The park is southwest of the City of Corning in the Town of Addison, east of Village of Addison.

Park description
A 9-hole golf course with picnic tables, pavilions, and club house operated in the park up until 2017 when it was closed.

The first section of Great Eastern Trail in New York was marked at Pinnacle State Park in 2008.

See also
 List of New York state parks

References

External links
 Pinnacle State Park and Golf Course at New York State Parks official website

Golf clubs and courses in New York (state)
Parks in Steuben County, New York
State parks of New York (state)